Ferdinando Glück (20 July 1901 – 2 December 1987) was an Italian cross-country skier. He competed in the men's 50 kilometre event at the 1928 Winter Olympics.

References

External links
 

1901 births
1987 deaths
Italian male cross-country skiers
Olympic cross-country skiers of Italy
Cross-country skiers at the 1928 Winter Olympics
People from Sëlva
Sportspeople from Südtirol